Adair Lake is a lake within the backcountry of Yosemite National Park, in the Sierra Nevada, Madera County, California.

Adair Lake was named for Charles F. Adair, who stocked the lake with trout in exchange for the naming rights.

See also
List of lakes in California

References

Lakes of the Sierra Nevada (United States)
Lakes of Madera County, California
Lakes of Yosemite National Park